Horne v. Flores, 557 U.S. 433 (2009), is a case in which the United States Supreme Court remanded the case to determine whether Arizona's general education funding budget supports Equal Educational Opportunities Act of 1974 (EEOA)-compliant English Language Learner (ELL) programming.

Background
The case was brought in 1992 by English Language Learner (ELL) students against the state board of education and state superintendent on the grounds that the Nogales Unified School District had failed to teach the students English, which was vital to their success.  The case is styled after the plaintiff, Miriam Flores, one of the parents involved in the case, and the defendant, Thomas Horne, the Arizona Superintendent of Public Instruction. 

In 2000, after almost eight years of pretrial proceedings and settling of various claims, the federal district court in Arizona held that the state was violating the Equal Educational Opportunity Act because the amount of funding it allocated for the special needs of ELL students was arbitrary and not related to the actual funding needed to cover the costs of ELL instruction in the plaintiffs' school district.

Opinion of the Court
On June 25, 2009, the United States Supreme Court overturned the decision of the state court, deciding in favor of Horne, and allowing the state to determine its own requirements with regards to ELL instruction. Justice Alito wrote the opinion for the 5-4 majority.  The opinion held that in evaluating the actions of the state attention should focus on student outcomes rather than on spending and inputs to schools.

Dissent
Justice Breyer, joined by Justice Stevens, Justice Souter, and Justice Ginsburg. Justice Breyer argued that the lower courts did fairly consider every change in circumstances that the parties called to their attention, and that the majority opinion risks denying schoolchildren the English language instruction necessary to overcome language barriers that impede equal participation.

See also
List of United States Supreme Court cases, volume 557
List of United States Supreme Court cases

References

External links
 

United States Supreme Court cases
United States education case law
Linguistic rights
2009 in United States case law
2009 in education
United States Supreme Court cases of the Roberts Court